Qaleh Cheh (also Romanized as Qal‘eh Cheh) is a village in Hoseynabad-e Goruh Rural District, Rayen District, Kerman County, Kerman Province, Iran. At the 2006 census, its population was 53, in 12 families.

References 

Populated places in Kerman County